Humphrey Lestocq (23 January 1919 – 29 January 1984) was a British actor, best known for his roles in Angels One Five (1952) and The Long Shadow (1961), and guest appearances in the television series The Avengers.

Lestocq shot to fame as Flying Officer Kyte in the BBC radio wartime comedy Merry-Go-Round (1944–1948), which later evolved into Much-Binding-in-the-Marsh.

He was also one of the presenters on the TV series Whirligig, the first children's programme to be broadcast live from the BBC's Lime Grove Studios. It ran from 1950 to 1956. Calling himself "H.L.", he was the stooge of the puppet Mr. Turnip, voiced by Peter Hawkins. Lestocq's catchphrases were "Goody, Goody Gumdrops" and "Jolly D", and Mr. Turnip's was "Lawky, Lawky, Lum".

Partial filmography

 Stop Press Girl (1949)
 Once a Sinner (1950)
 Two on the Tiles (1951)
 Angels One Five (1952)
 Come Back Peter (1952)
 The Good Beginning (1953)
 Meet Mr. Lucifer (1953)
 Conflict of Wings (1954)
 The Son of Robin Hood (1958)
 Life in Danger (1959)
 Not a Hope in Hell (1960)
 The Unstoppable Man (1960)
 Bomb in the High Street (1961)
 The Court Martial of Major Keller (1961)
 The Long Shadow (1961)
 Pit of Darkness (1961)
 The Third Alibi (1961)
 Design for Loving (1962)

Family
He was born Humphrey Lestocq Gilbert on 23 January 1919 in Chiswick, London, England. His parents were George Marx Gilbert and May Frances née Wooldridge, married 1911 in Brentford (Chiswick).  They had three sons, George (1912), Maurice (1913), and Humphrey. He married Dallas E Edwards in 1943.  They had two children – Michael (1945), and Patricia (1947).  That marriage finished and Gilbert lived in common-law marriage with Mary Barnard Bilton until his death.  After retiring from acting, he ran a fishing fleet from Rye Harbour, East Sussex. He was an avid collector of English silver coins.  He died on 29 January 1984 in London.

Gilbert's mother came from a large family around Brentford, London.  Her father was William Lestocq.

References

1919 births
1984 deaths
English male film actors
English male television actors
English male radio actors
20th-century English male actors
People from Chiswick
Male actors from London